Douglas A. Sutherland (August 1, 1948 – April 5, 2022) was an American professional football player who was a defensive tackle in the National Football League (NFL). He played college football at the University of Wisconsin–Superior in his hometown of Superior, Wisconsin. He was selected in the 1970 NFL Draft with the New Orleans Saints and then became a part of the famous Purple People Eaters for the Minnesota Vikings from 1971 through 1980, primarily filling in for Gary Larsen in 1975. He played in Super Bowls VIII, IX and XI. He finished his NFL career in 1981 with the Seattle Seahawks.

Honours

National Football League (with Minnesota Vikings)
Runners-up (3): 1973, 1974, 1976

References

1948 births
2022 deaths
Sportspeople from Superior, Wisconsin
Players of American football from Wisconsin
American football defensive linemen
Wisconsin–Superior Yellowjackets football players
New Orleans Saints players
Minnesota Vikings players
Seattle Seahawks players